Nelson Glam railway station served the village of Nelson, in the historical county of Glamorganshire, Wales, from 1900 to 1932 on the Llancaiach Branch.

History 
The station was opened as Nelson on 1 June 1900 by the Taff Vale Railway. Its name was changed to Nelson Glam on 1 July 1924. It closed on 12 September 1932.

References 

Railway stations in Great Britain opened in 1900
Railway stations in Great Britain closed in 1932
1900 establishments in Wales
1932 disestablishments in Wales
Former Taff Vale Railway stations